Roman Torn (born 17 April 1967 in Burnaby, British Columbia) is a retired Canadian alpine skier who competed in the 1992 Winter Olympics.

External links
 sports-reference.com
 

1967 births
Living people
Canadian male alpine skiers
Olympic alpine skiers of Canada
Alpine skiers at the 1992 Winter Olympics
Sportspeople from Burnaby
20th-century Canadian people